Cyril Winthrop Mackworth-Praed (21 September 1891 – 30 June 1974) was a British sport shooter who competed in the 1924 Summer Olympics. He was also a naturalist and ornithologist who specialized on the birds of Africa.

Life and work 
Mackworth-Praed was born in Herefordshire to Robert Herbert and Mary Josephine Jolliffe. where he became interested in shooting and natural history which was also encouraged at school in Sandroyd. After studying at Eton and Trinity College, Cambridge, he settled in East Africa as a farmer.  In 1919 he married, Edith Mary Henrietta, the daughter of Stephenson Robert Clarke and began to help identify African birds in his father-in-law's collection. This brought him to the bird room of the British Museum. He later joined the Scots Guards and served in World War II, rising to the rank of Major in 1941. He returned to live in Castletop, Burley, Hampshire. In the 1930s he began a collaboration with Claude H. B. Grant to produce a 6 volume work on the birds of Africa. In 1958, Grant died and only two volumes were produced. The remainder, completed in 1973, was written by Mackworth-Praed.

He had a parallel career as a sport shooter. In 1924 he won the gold medal as member of the British team in the team running deer, double shots event. He also won two silver medals in the running deer, single shots and double shots competition. In the 1924 Summer Olympics he also participated in the following events:

 Team 100 metre running deer, single shots - fourth place
 Team clay pigeons - eighth place
 individual trap - result unknown
He also competed at the 1952 Summer Olympics. 

He was appointed OBE in 1964.

References

External links
profile

 Duck-ringing at Orielton Decoy Pond (1938), film made by Mackworth-Praed

1974 deaths
1891 births
British male sport shooters
Running target shooters
Alumni of Trinity College, Cambridge
Olympic shooters of Great Britain
Shooters at the 1924 Summer Olympics
Shooters at the 1952 Summer Olympics
English Olympic medallists
Olympic gold medallists for Great Britain
Olympic silver medallists for Great Britain
Trap and double trap shooters
Olympic medalists in shooting
Medalists at the 1924 Summer Olympics